Among pnictogen group Lewis acidic compounds, unusual lewis acidity of Lewis acidic antimony compounds have long been exploited as both stable conjugate acids of non-coordinating anions ( and ), and strong Lewis acid counterparts of well-known superacids (magic acids, fluoroantimonic acid). Also, Lewis-acidic antimony compounds have recently been investigated to extend the chemistry of boron because of the isolobal analogy between the vacant p orbital of borane and σ*(Sb–X) orbitals of stiborane, and the similar electronegativities of antimony (2.05) and boron (2.04).

Origin of acidity 

σ*(Sb–X), where X describes substituents on antimony, contributes to the Lewis acidity of antimony compounds in two ways: donor–acceptor orbital interaction and electrostatic interaction. These two contributions to the Lewis acidity have been evaluated. Both contributions are studied by calculations, and the acidities of theses compounds are quantified by the Gutmann–Beckett method, Hammett acidity function, pKa, and fluoride ion affinity (FIA). FIA is defined as the amount of energy released upon binding a fluoride ion in the gas phase. The FIA of two popular strong Lewis acids, BF3 and B(C6F5)3, are  respectively.

Donor–acceptor orbital overlap 
Since Lewis adducts are formed by dative bond between Lewis bases and Lewis acids, the orbital overlap between the Lewis base and σ*(Sb–X) orbital is the source of the acidity. According to Gabbaï et al., NBO analysis of the Sb(C6F5)3P(O)Ph3 adduct indicates a donor-acceptor interaction between lp(O) and σ*(Sb–C6F5).

Lowering the LUMO (σ*(Sb–X)) energy increases the Lewis acidity. For example, Sb(C6H5)3 has a higher LUMO energy (−0.55 eV) and weaker FIA (59 kcal/mol) than Sb(C6F5)3 (−1.76 eV and 89 kcal/mol).

Electrostatic interaction 
Partial positive charges on the surface of antimony compounds interact with partial negative charges. For example, Sb(C6F5)3(o-O2C6Cl4) has a more positively charged site than Sb(C6F5)3 as shown in its electrostatic potential map, corresponding to higher Lewis acidity (the FIA of Sb(C6F5)3(o-O2C6Cl4) and Sb(C6F5)3 are 116 and 89 kcal/mol, respectively).

Structure of Lewis acidic antimony compounds 
Lewis acidic antimony complexes with a variety of oxidation states and coordination numbers are known. Several salient examples are introduced below.

3-coordinate Sb(III) 
Although stibanes have a lone pair electrons, their antibonding orbitals with electron-withdrawing substituents renders them Lewis acidic. Sb(C6F5)3 (3) has three σ*(Sb–C6F5) orbitals and three Lewis acidic sites. However, as shown in the electrostatic potential map of Sb(C6F5)3, only one site is accessible to Lewis bases due to the asymmetric arrangement of the three aryl rings.

In [Sb(tol)(Cp*)]2+ (1), the η5-Cp* binding mode is confirmed using IBO analysis. In the solid state structure, the Sb-C bond distances between Sb and carbons in the Cp* ring are 2.394(4) to 2.424(4) Å, but the Sb–C bond distances with the toluene are 2.993(5) to 3.182(5) Å. This longer Sb–toluene distance implies toluene lability in solution.

Sb2(o-catecholate)2(μ-O) (2) had been predicted that a Lewis base would bind to two antimony centers in a bridging manner. However, it was observed that 2 binds with halide anions in various ratios (3:1, 2:1, 1:1, 1:2, 1:3). Cozzolono et al. suggested three reasons for its complex binding mode. First, rotational freedom around the bridge oxygen disrupts the Lewis base binding between two antimony centers. Second, intramolecular interactions between oxygen at catecholate and antimony competes with external Lewis base binding. Third, a high-polarity  nucleophilic solvent, dimethylsulfoxide, is required to dissolve 2 due to the solubility and the solvent is also able to bind at antimony.

3-coordinate Sb(V) 
[SbPh3]2+ (4) was not isolated. Instead, its Lewis adducts, [SbPh3(OPPh3)2]2+ and [SbPh3(dmap)2(OTf)]+, were isolated. In the trigonal bipyramidal [SbPh3(OPPh3)2]2+, two OPPh3 are located in axial positions and the Sb–O bond distance (2.102(2) Å) is similar to the sum of the covalent radii of Sb and O (2.05 Å). In the distorted octahedral [SbPh3(dmap)2(OTf)]+, the Sb–N distance with the dmap (2.222(2) Å) is shorter than reported N–Sb+ distances. This bond distance implies Lewis adduct formation. In addition, a reaction between dmap and [SbPh3(OPPh3)2]2+ forms [SbPh3(dmap)2(OTf)]+. The experimental results indicate that [SbPh3]2+ is the Lewis acidic counterpart of these adducts.

4-coordinate Sb(V) 
Tetrahedral stibonium cations also show Lewis acidity. Since [Sb(C6F5)4]+ (5) forms an adduct with triflate, the cation can be isolated as a [Sb(C6F5)4][B(C6F5)4] salt. Short Sb–C bond distances of 2.095(2) Å and a tetrahedral space group in the crystal proves that isolated [Sb(C6F5)4]+ is completely free of external electron donors. This cationic antimony Lewis acid shows strong acidity: firstly, [Sb(C6F5)4]+ abstracts fluoride anion from weakly coordinating anions, and secondly, the acidity measured by the Gutmann–Beckett method of [Sb(C6F5)4]+ (5) is comparable with that of the B(C6F5)3 adduct in CH2Cl2 (76.6 ppm).

SbPh3(Ant)+ (6) (where Ant is 9-anthryl) was isolated as triflate salt. 6 has a tetrahedral structure like 5. In a solid state structure of a fluoride adduct, AntPh3SbF, the incoming fluoride occupies the axial position of a trigonal bipyramidal structure, and the sterically-demanding anthryl is located at the equatorial site.

5-coordinate Sb(V) 
Neutral Sb(V) complexes are also Lewis acids. Compounds 7, 8 and 11 share the structure of spirocyclic stiborane. The LUMO of 8 mainly has its lobe at the antimony atoms and it renders 8 Lewis acidic. In detail, the LUMO can be assigned to as localized orbital on stiborafluorene moiety with larger nodes at the 9-position (Sb). Thus, Lewis bases bind towards trans to biphenylene and its fluoride adducts are asymmetric: 8·F− has two enantiomers and 7·F− has two diastereomers and four enantiomers.

A bisantimony complex (9) is synthesized starting from xanthene. 9 has C2 symmetry and the Sb–Sb distance is 4.7805(7) Å. Both antimony(V) centers have distorted square pyramidal geometry with the geometry index τ5 = 0.08. The base planes of the antimony centers meet face to face and this geometry allows 1:1 binding with F−, unlike 2.

Trends in acidity

Inductive effect 
Introduction of electron-withdrawing substituents on antimony results in increased acidity. For example, intramolecular donor–acceptor interactions of two stiboranes, o-C6H4(PPh2)[SbPh2(O2C6Cl4)] and o-C6H4(PPh2)[Sb(C6F5)2(O2C6Cl4)], have been analyzed by AIM. AIM analysis of electron density at the bond critical point (bcp) and delocalization index indicates that electron-withdrawing substituents on Sb(V) lead to an increased P–Sb bonding covalency.
{| class="wikitable"
|+AIM analysis of the intramolecular donor-acceptor interactions of two stiboranes
!P-Sb bonding
!o-C6H4(PPh2)(Sb(C6F5)2(O2C6Cl4)
!o-C6H4(PPh2)(Sb(C6H5)2(O2C6Cl4)
|-
|Electron density at the bcp (e/rBohr3)
|0.054
|0.035
|-
|Delocalization index
|0.38
|0.24
|}

Bisantimony compounds vs mono-antimony compounds 
A bisantimony complex (9) is a stronger Lewis acid than a monoantimony compound (8) because both Lewis acidic sites cooperatively contribute to the Lewis base binding. The electrostatic potential map of 9 shows positive charges on the Sb centers facing each other.

This cooperativity is supported by the Sb-(μ-F)-Sb moiety in solid state structure of F− binding bisantimony compound 9.

Applications

Fluoride anion sensor 
Owing to their high fluoride ion affinity, Lewis acidic antimony compounds may be utilized in fluoride anion sensing. The 9-anthryltriphenylstibonium cation (5) shows weak fluorescent emission (Φ = 0.7%), but a corresponding fluoride adduct, fluorostiborane, shows a strong anthryl-based emission at 427 nm (Φ = 9.5% in CHCl3). Owing to its stability in water, 5 can be used as an aqueous fluoride sensor. Owing to its fluorescence turn-on response to fluoride binding, as little as 1 ppm of F− can be detected with the naked eye, which have not been achieved by previously reported fluorescent boron compounds with high FIA.

In addition, fluoride-selective electrodes were developed by using Lewis acidic antimony compounds as ionophores.

Catalysis 

Strongly acidic antimony compounds are able to catalyze organic transformations (such as the transfer hydrogenation and the Ritter reaction). Interestingly, Sb(C6F5)3 shows high catalytic efficiency compared to its acidity because the π-acidity of its aryl ring also plays a role in catalysis.

Tetraarylstibonium cations catalyze cycloadditions between epoxides and CO2 or isocyanate to produce oxazolidinones.

Transition metal complexes 

Lewis acidic antimony compounds can act as Z-type ligands. Owing to the strong σ-accepting ability of dicationic Sb ligand, a gold-antimony complex can catalyze styrene polymerization and hydroamination after being activated by AgNTf2.

See also 
Antimony
Organoantimony chemistry
Superacid

References

Pnictogens
Anions
Chemistry